Nikolay "Mykolas" Rudzinskas (4 January 1933 – 29 April 2006) was a Soviet sprint canoeist who competed in the late 1950s and early 1960s. He won a bronze medal in the K-4 10000 m event at the 1958 ICF Canoe Sprint World Championships in Prague.

Rudzinskas also finished fourth in the K-2 1000 m event at the 1960 Summer Olympics in Rome.

References

Nikolay Rudzinkas profile at Sports Reference.com
Nikolay Rudzinkas' profile at Lietuvos sporto enciklopedija 

1933 births
2006 deaths
Canoeists at the 1960 Summer Olympics
Olympic canoeists of the Soviet Union
Soviet male canoeists
Russian male canoeists
ICF Canoe Sprint World Championships medalists in kayak